Len Taunyane (  1880s – after 1904) was a South African track and field athlete who competed in the 1904 Summer Olympics in the Men's marathon, and was therefore one of the first two black Africans to participate in the modern Olympic Games.

Early life
Taunyane was a member of the Tswana people and a veteran of the Second Boer War, having served as a despatch runner. A photo taken between 1900 and 1902 shows him as a prisoner-of-war on Saint Helena. Little is otherwise known about his life. Taunyane may have been a student at the University of the Free State. He travelled to the United States in 1904 to appear in the Boer War Exhibition at the St Louis World's Fair. There he participated in twice-daily re-enactments of the Battle of Colenso and the Battle of Paardeberg.

1904 Marathon
The 1904 Marathon was a largely informal affair, run on an unsuitable course and over roads so dusty that it caused many of the athletes to collapse. Taunyane entered the race at the last minute, as a Tswana and therefore did not formally represent South Africa that existed only in 1910 as Union of South Africa. He was referred to as "Len Tau" or "Lentauw" by officials who could not pronounce his name.

Taunyane likely ran barefoot, and finished in ninth place out of a field of 32 and 14 finishers. This was a disappointment, as many observers were sure that Taunyane could have done better if he had not been chased nearly a mile off course by aggressive dogs.

Nothing is known of Taunyane's later life.

References

External links

Year of birth unknown
Year of death unknown
Athletes (track and field) at the 1904 Summer Olympics
South African male marathon runners
Olympic athletes of South Africa
Tswana people
Boer military personnel of the Second Boer War